Monophosphatidylinositol phosphodiesterase may refer to:
 Phosphatidylinositol diacylglycerol-lyase, an enzyme
 Phosphoinositide phospholipase C, an enzyme